Christchurch West High School (originally Christchurch Academy then High School of Christchurch and then West Christchurch Borough School) existed prior to 1966 on the site of Hagley College in Hagley Avenue, in Christchurch, New Zealand. In that year 'West' amalgamated with Technical High School to become Hagley High School.  As part of that amalgamation, the maroon, black and white colours were changed to teal.

History

The school was opened on 15 November 1858 by the St. Andrew's Presbyterian Church on their triangular site formed by Tuam Street, Antigua Street, and Oxford Terrace. The original name was Christchurch Academy and the school enjoyed a good reputation. The name changed to High School of Christchurch when the school relocated in July 1863.

A main source of income for early Christchurch schools was an annual grant by the Canterbury Provincial Council, with funds distributed to school committees in proportion of the denomination of the population. The educational system changed in 1873 and the province discontinued its grants. Reluctantly, the school committee decided to offer the school buildings and grounds to the newly established West Christchurch educational committee. The chairman of the West Christchurch educational committee, Henry Tancred, sanctioned the purchase in September 1873. The school was renamed West Christchurch Borough School and it became public that year; 70 existing pupils transferred to the new school. The roll greatly increased and by the end of 1877, there were 868 pupils.

Heritage registration
The main school building, built in 1924, is registered by Heritage New Zealand as a Category II heritage structure with registration number 1874. It was originally called the West Christchurch Public School. A centenary book was published in 1958.

Notable staff
 Tony Foster (1853–1918), headmaster from 1882 until ca 1904
 William Habens (1839–1899), on the staff from 1868

Notable alumni

 Derek Arnold (born 1941), All Blacks player
 Sir Frank Callaway (1919–2003), influential music educator and administrator in Perth, Western Australia
 Colleen Dewe (1930–1993), National MP for Lyttelton (1975–1978)
 Pauline Gardiner (born 1947), former member of parliament
 Sydney Josland (1904–1991), bacteriologist
 Tommy Taylor (1862–1911), former Christchurch Mayor, New Zealand Member of Parliament, businessman and prohibitionist (advocate of temperance)
 Ada Wells (1863–1933), suffragette
 Owen Wilkes (1940–2005), peace campaigner
 Cecil Wood (1878–1947), architect

References

Secondary schools in Christchurch
Defunct schools in New Zealand
Heritage New Zealand Category 2 historic places in Canterbury, New Zealand
Christchurch Central City
1924 establishments in New Zealand
1920s architecture in New Zealand